Emil Juhana Pesonen (16 September 1883, Kerimäki – 30 April 1958) was a Finnish farmer and politician. He served as a Member of the Parliament of Finland from  1930 to 1933, representing the National Coalition Party.

References

1883 births
1958 deaths
People from Kerimäki
People from Mikkeli Province (Grand Duchy of Finland)
National Coalition Party politicians
Members of the Parliament of Finland (1930–33)